Larry Hope (born October 19, 1993) is a gridiron football cornerback for the Montreal Alouettes of the Canadian Football League (CFL). He played college football at Akron.

High school
Hope was a three-star recruit according to Rivals.com, ESPN and Scout.com. He was rated as No. 59 cornerback prospect according to ESPN, and chose to attend Miami over Schools such as Nebraska and Wisconsin and more.

College career
As a redshirt freshman in 2013, Hope saw action in five games, primarily on special teams and as reserve defensive back. After the 2013 season, Hope decided to transfer from Miami. He decided to go to Akron and had to sat the 2014 season due to NCAA transfer rules.

Professional career
Hope signed with the Miami Dolphins as an undrafted free agent on May 5, 2017.

References

External links
Akron Zips bio

1993 births
Living people
Players of American football from Miami
Akron Zips football players
Miami Dolphins players
Players of Canadian football from Miami